The Polish Initiative (Polish: Inicjatywa Polska, iPL) is a progressive political party in Poland.

It was formed as an association in 2016, and it was registered as a political party in 2019. Its leader is Barbara Nowacka, and it is a part of the Civic Coalition. It supports principles of social-democracy, and advocates for secularism. It has been described as centre-left and left-wing.

History
The association Polish Initiative was created on February 20, 2016, by Barbara Nowacka, a former member of the Your Movement and the United Left electoral alliance for the 2015 parliamentary election. It was registered as a political party in 2019.

In 2018 the Initiative joined the Civic Coalition for the local elections. Two of its candidates were elected to the Voivodeship sejmiks.

The association  joined the European Coalition for the 2019 European Parliament election. However, because of being in the process of the registration as a political party, its members did not compete in the election.

The party joined the Civic Coalition for the 2019 parliamentary election. Two of the party candidates, including its leader Barbara Nowacka and two candidates recommended by the party, were elected to the Sejm. The Coalition won 134 in total, losing to the ruling party Law and Justice.

The Polish Initiative supported the Civic Coalition's candidate Małgorzata Kidawa-Błońska in the 2020 presidential election. Later, the Polish Initiative announced that it would as a party not take part in the election on 10 May, due change of electoral rules because of the COVID-19 pandemic. However, after the election was moved it supported Rafał Trzaskowski, who became the Civic Coalition's candidate after the resignation of Małgorzata Kidawa-Błońska. Trzaskowski later lost in the second round to the incumbent Andrzej Duda.

Ideology
The Polish Initiative is a progressive, and social-democratic party. It sits on the centre-left and leans towards the left-wing on the political spectrum.

The party supports the decentralisation of power and increasing the power of local governments. It also supports European integration. On social issues, it is against any forms of discrimination, with an emphasis on gender discrimination. The party also advocates for the separation of church and state. The party also supports increasing the funding of the Polish healthcare system.

Electoral performance

Sejm

Presidential

Regional Assemblies

Board
Leader
 Barbara Nowacka
Secretary
 Tomasz Sybilski
Treasurer
 Katarzyna Osowiecka
Other members
 Anna Uzdowska-Gacek
 Barbara Starska
 Dariusz Joński
 Szymon Wiłnicki
 Adam Ostaszewski
 Mateusz Rambacher
 Arkadiusz Dzierżyński

References

2019 establishments in Poland
Centre-left parties in Europe
Civic Coalition (Poland)
 
Political parties established in 2019
Political parties in Poland
Pro-European political parties in Poland
Liberal parties in Poland
Progressive parties
Social democratic parties in Poland